Chiayi Old Prison is a former prison located at 140 Wei Hsin Road, East District, Chiayi City, Taiwan. It underwent restoration and reopened as the Chiayi Prison Museum in 2011. It was designated as a historic monument of Taiwan in 2005.

History
Chiayi Prison commenced its operation in 1922 under the name of Tainan Prison Chiayi Branch. In 1994, the Chiayi Prison was relocated to Lucao Township in Chiayi County.

Architecture
A distinct feature of the Chiayi Old Prison is the radial layout of the prison blocks with a staff positioned hall in the center. In contrast to the design of panopticon prisons, individual cells cannot be seen by the staff in the central hall unless they enter individual prison blocks. Another other similar Pennsylvania-style prison building is the Abashiri Prison in Hokkaido, Japan.

Transportation
The museum is accessible within walking distance East from Beimen Station of the Alishan Forest Railway.

See also
 List of museums in Taiwan
 Abashiri Prison

References

External links

The Forgotten Corner – Old Chiayi Prison
Within these walls- a tour of Chiayi Prison

East District, Chiayi
History museums in Taiwan
Museums in Chiayi
Defunct prisons in Taiwan
Prison museums in Asia
National monuments of Taiwan